Tanera Mòr (Scottish Gaelic: Tannara Mòr) is an uninhabited (previously inhabited) island in Loch Broom in the Inner Hebrides of Scotland. It is the largest of the Summer Isles and was the last inhabited island in that group. Tanera Mòr has issued its own postage stamps and was the location of Frank Fraser Darling's book Island Years. In 2014, it was reported that it was sold for 1.6 million to millionaire Ian Wace.

Geography

The highest hill is Meall Mòr (a common Scottish mountain name, meaning a "big rounded hill").

The rock is Torridonian sandstone covered with peat and pasture.

History
The island was a port for herring fishing, and suffered the decline of that industry. The two settlements were known as Ardnagoine and Garadheancal.

In 1881, there were no fewer than 118 people living on Tanera Mòr, all of whom had left by 1931 (one year after St Kilda was abandoned). Permanent habitation has been intermittent since then, with six people identified as resident in 1961, eight in 1981, none in 1991 and then five at the 2001 census and four in 2011.

The island was bought in the early 1960s by Ken Frampton. In September 2012, it was revealed that the island's owners Lizzie and Richard Williams were considering a community buyout with residents on the mainland nearby. The price to the Coigach development trust has been assessed at £2.6 million. This proposal did not progress, however, and the island was placed on the open market in May 2013 for £2.5 million. By 2014 the price had been dropped to £1.95 million by owners Richard and Lizzie Williams, who had moved to the mainland.

In June 2017, Ian Wace purchased the island for £1.7 million, far less than the £2.5 million asking price when it was put on the market in 2013. It was reported that he would oversee a four-year development of Tanera Mòr, which could become an "idyllic retreat capable of hosting up to 60 paying guests".

Facilities and infrastructure
Tanera Mòr is home to a salmon fish farm, several holiday cottages, a small sailing school, a café and a post office, which has operated its own local post and printed its own stamps since 1970. The island previously had no roads and the only recognisable path went around An Acarsaid ("The Anchorage"), the sheltered bay on the east side of the island. Since 2017, the redevelopment of the island has involved the creation of several roads. Tanera Mòr, like the other Summer Isles, can be seen from the Stornoway to Ullapool ferry. The island can be reached by boat from either Achiltibuie in Wester Ross, or Ullapool.

Literary references
Tanera Mòr was the location for Frank Fraser Darling's book Island Years (published 1940), which describes experiences living on a remote island. Living in Tanera Mòr and Dundonnell before that, Fraser Darling began the work that was to mark him as a naturalist-philosopher of original turn of mind and great intellectual drive. He described the social and breeding behaviour of the red deer, gulls, and the grey seal respectively, in the three academic works A Herd of Red Deer, Bird Flocks and the Breeding Cycle and A Naturalist on Rona. The outbreak of World War II put an end to Fraser Darling's hopes of undertaking further research on the grey seal, and being too old for active military service, he chose to farm rather than leave the west coast of Scotland for wartime civilian work. Between 1939 and 1943 Fraser Darling reclaimed derelict land to agricultural production on Tanera Mòr in the Summer Isles, an undertaking described in his 1943 book Island Farm. In 1942 the wartime Secretary of State for Scotland, Tom Johnston, asked Fraser Darling if he would run an agricultural advisory programme in the crofting areas of the Scottish Highlands and Islands. He agreed, and for two years he travelled, taught and wrote articles that were later published in book form as Crofting Agriculture.

The pagan-cult island of Summerisle featured in the motion picture The Wicker Man (filmed 1973) is thought by some film critics to be set in this archipelago, although the movie itself was filmed in Galloway and Skye.

The Summer Isles feature in a novella of the same name by Ian R. MacLeod.

Wildlife
The island's floral diversity is strong due to the lack of grazing over the last 25 years, with northern marsh orchids and greater butterfly-orchids particularly strong. Eurasian otters are active, whilst common and grey seals frequently visit from the other nearby Summer Isles, and basking sharks and  porpoises pass by in summer. Bird species include common eider, grey heron, red grouse, and common buzzards.

See also

 List of islands of Scotland

References

External links
  Summer Isles website
 Fraser Darling, Frank (1940) Island Years. G. Bell and Sons.
 Keay, J. & Keay, J. (1994) Collins Encyclopaedia of Scotland. London. HarperCollins. (Entry: Summer Isles)

Summer Isles
Uninhabited islands of Highland (council area)